Kristin Brinker (born April 6, 1972 in Bernburg) is a German politician. A member of the Alternative for Germany (AFD) party, Brinker has been a member of the Berlin House of Representatives since 2016. Brinker has been state chair of the Berlin AfD since March 2021.

Life 
Kristin Brinker was born in Bernburg in 1972 and, according to her own account, grew up working-class. Brinker became an investment advisor at the Berliner Volksbank and trained as a cooperative bank clerk.

Brinker joined the AfD in 2013 and is considered part of the “more liberal" wing of the party.  Brinker defeated Beatrix von Storch in 2021 to become chair of the Berlin AfD.

References 

German politicians
Alternative for Germany politicians
1972 births
Living people
Members of the Abgeordnetenhaus of Berlin
21st-century German women politicians
People from Bernburg